Novechiniscus armadilloides is a species of terrestrial tardigrade. It is the only species of the genus Novechiniscus, which belongs to the family Echiniscidae. The species is endemic to the United States in the state of Utah.

The species was first described by Robert O. Schuster in 1975 as Parechiniscus armadilloides. It was placed in its own genus Novechiniscus by Reinhardt Møbjerg Kristensen in 1987.

References

Further reading
Kristensen, 1987 : Generic revision of the Echiniscidae (Heterotardigrada), with a discussion of the origin of the family. Collana U.Z.I. Selected Symposia and Monographs, no. 1, p. 261-335.
 Schuster, 1975 : A new species of Parechiniscus from Utah (Tardigrada: Echiniscidae). Memorie dell'Istituto Italiano di Idrobiologia Dott. Marco de Marchi, vol. 32 suppl., p. 333-336.

Echiniscidae
Endemic fauna of Utah
Animals described in 1987
Taxa named by Reinhardt Møbjerg Kristensen